John Wilson (1894 – July 1957) was an English professional footballer who played as a left back and made over 460 appearances in the Scottish League for Heart of Midlothian, Dunfermline Athletic, Hamilton Academical and St Johnstone. He made one wartime appearance for the Scottish League XI. After retiring as a player, Wilson was involved in the founding of Junior club Haddington Athletic in the late 1930s.

Personal life 
Wilson's father Hughie was a Scottish international footballer who was playing for Sunderland at the time of Wilson's birth. The family eventually moved back to Scotland and settled in Newmilns. After enlisting in April 1916, Wilson served as a private in the Royal Scots during the First World War and was wounded on the Western Front in April 1917 and March 1918. As a teenager, Wilson had trained as a lace weaver and he returned to the profession in Ayrshire part-time after the war, before re-entering professional football. He worked at Castle Mills Rubber Works in Fountainbridge during the early years of the First World War and after retiring from football, he ran a fishmongers in Haddington.

Career statistics

Honours 
Heart of Midlothian
 East of Scotland Shield (2): 1914–15, 1918–19
Wilson Cup (2): 1918–19, 1922–23
Rosebery Charity Cup (3): 1915–16, 1922–23, 1923–24

Dunfermline Athletic
 Scottish League Second Division: 1925–26

St Johnstone

 Scottish League Second Division second-place promotion: 1931–32

See also
Heart of Midlothian F.C. and World War I

References 

English footballers
Scottish Football League players
British Army personnel of World War I
Heart of Midlothian F.C. players
1957 deaths
1894 births
Footballers from Sunderland
Footballers from East Ayrshire
Association football fullbacks
Royal Scots soldiers
Dunfermline Athletic F.C. players
Hamilton Academical F.C. players
St Johnstone F.C. players
Anglo-Scots
Penicuik Athletic F.C. players